Sharon Millerchip is an Australian actress, dancer, director, and choreographer, best known for her performances in major musical theatre productions.

Millerchip grew up in Davidson, New South Wales and attended Kambora Public School and Davidson High School, where she participated in the dance program. Growing up, she attended Johnny Young Talent School, and during high school, she performed with the Forest Youth Theatre Company. After enrolling in college for dance, she auditioned for and was accepted into the Australian of production of Cats. She understudied several roles before she took over the role of Demeter.

Millerchip played Meg Giry in the original Australian production of The Phantom of the Opera. She also originated the role of Little Red Ridinghood in the Sydney Theatre Company production of Into the Woods opposite Philip Quast as the Big Bad Wolf/Cinderella’s Prince. 

Further Sydney Theatre Company credits include originating the role of Cordelia in Falsettos, 

In the mid to late 1990s, she took over major roles in long-running Australian productions of West Side Story as Anita (replacing Caroline O'Connor), Beauty and the Beast as Belle (replacing Rachael Beck) and Chicago as Velma Kelly (replacing O'Connor). In 2011, she played Meg Giry in the Australian production of Love Never Dies, the sequel to The Phantom of the Opera. Two years later, she performed in Bombshells at the Ensemble Theatre. In 2019, she originated the role of Caroline in the new Australian musical FANGIRLS at the Belvoir St Theatre. She appears on the FANGIRLS: World Premiere Cast Recording album, which was released on April 30, 2021.

In addition to performing in shows, Millerchip has also directed several shows, including Aladdin and Strictly Ballroom. She is currently the associate director for the Australian tour production of Six.

Awards
Millerchip has won three Helpmann Awards. She has twice received Best Female Actor in a Musical for productions of Chicago, in 2001 as Velma Kelly and in 2009 as Roxie Hart. She was awarded Best Female Actor in a Supporting Role in a Musical in 2008 for The Rocky Horror Show. She also won two Mo Awards for Best Supporting Actress in a Musical as Little Red Riding Hood in Into the Woods and for Best Leading Actress in a Musical as Belle in Beauty and the Beast.

Mo Awards
The Australian Entertainment Mo Awards (commonly known informally as the Mo Awards), were annual Australian entertainment industry awards. They recognise achievements in live entertainment in Australia from 1975 to 2016. Sharon Millerchip won two awards in that time.
 (wins only)
|-
| 1993 
| Sharon Millerchip
| Supporting Musical Theatre Performer of the Year 
| 
|-
| 1996
| Sharon Millerchip
| Female Musical Theatre Performer of the Year
| 
|-

References 

Living people
People educated at Davidson High School
Year of birth missing (living people)
Australian theatre directors
Helpmann Award winners
Australian musical theatre actresses
Actresses from New South Wales